This is a list of heads of the Zenica-Doboj Canton.

Heads of the Zenica-Doboj Canton (1995–present)

Governors

Prime Ministers

External links
World Statesmen - Zenica-Doboj Canton

Zenica-Doboj Canton